Naurangabad is a village and location of the Indus Valley civilization archaeological site in Bhiwani district of Haryana state in India.

References

Indus Valley civilisation sites
Villages in Bhiwani district